Everton Nogueira (born 12 December 1959) is a former Brazilian football player who played as an attacking midfielder.

Club statistics

References

External links
 
 

1959 births
Living people
Brazilian footballers
Association football midfielders
Campeonato Brasileiro Série A players
Campeonato Brasileiro Série B players
Londrina Esporte Clube players
São Paulo FC players
Guarani FC players
Clube Atlético Mineiro players
Sport Club Corinthians Paulista players
Primeira Liga players
FC Porto players
Japan Soccer League players
J1 League players
Japan Football League (1992–1998) players
Yokohama F. Marinos players
Kyoto Sanga FC players
Brazilian expatriate footballers
Brazilian expatriate sportspeople in Portugal
Expatriate footballers in Portugal
Brazilian expatriate sportspeople in Japan
Expatriate footballers in Japan
Footballers from São Paulo (state)